Statutory speed limit in Japan defaults to  for divided national expressways and  for any other roads, unless otherwise posted.

Summary
There are no separate urban or rural statutory limits. Urban and rural limits are set by zoning rather than statute.

Implementation of speed limits in Japan can be summarized as:
 variable speed limits are in effect on most national expressways.
Police vehicles are exempt during speeding enforcement.

Enforcement

Speed camera
This is due to legal precedents dating back to 1969 restricting police from filming an individual unless a criminal offence is immediately being committed.

Police enforcement
Although there is no official tolerance for exceeding the speed limit, most drivers in Japan tend to drive over the speed limit on major roads. Police enforcement varies depending on the jurisdiction, officers, traffic flow and street types, but 19 km/h (12 MPH) above the speed limit on an expressway and 14 km/h (9 MPH) above the limit are generally tolerated on other streets.

In 2020, a total of 1,162,420 speeding tickets were issued across Japan, and only 199 tickets were issued for speeding between 0–14 km/h (0-9 MPH) over the limit. Of the 199 tickets for speeding 0–14 km/h (0-9 MPH) over the limit, Iwate Prefectural Police alone issued 166 tickets. For speeding between 15 and 19 km/h over the limit, Hokkaido, Aichi, Kyoto, Osaka and Fukuoka had the largest shares of tickets issued.

In contrast, Okinawa did not issue any tickets for speeding between 0–19 km/h (0-12 MPH) over the limit. Tokyo Metropolitan Police issued a total of 68,693 speeding tickets, but gave out only seven tickets for speeding between 0–19 km/h (0-12 MPH) over the limit. Some jurisdictions, such as Tokyo Metropolitan Police, release traffic enforcement locations on their websites.

Speed limit guidelines

Although some surface streets such as viaducts, trunk and bypass roads are built to expressway standards, many are not legally classified as expressways and are typically distinguishable by the colour of direction signs: surface streets use blue direction signs while expressways use green signs.

Surface streets
Speed limits for surface streets are set within ± of the reference speed limit below. Reference speed limits do not apply to expressways.

Expressways
The speed limit is set with respect for the lowest "structure compatible speed" (構造適合速度, kōzō tekigō sokudo) criteria below, that is based on design speed.

Intercity expressways typically have higher speed limits, while urban expressways within major cities often have  limits and two-lane expressways, typically in rural and remote areas, have  limits for undivided and  limits with physical separation.

Most expressways outside of cities have active variable speed limit signs and maximum speeds are lowered according to road conditions such as congestions, accidents, constructions and severe weather.

lane width (3.5 m ≤ : 120 km/h, < 3.5 m : 80 km/h)

shoulder width (1.75 m ≤ : 120 km/h, < 1.75 m : 80 km/h)

References

Japan
Road transport in Japan